Jessica Elleisse Huntley (née Carroll; 23 February 1927 – 13 October 2013) was an African-Guyanese-British woman, a political reformer, prominent race equality campaigner, the pioneering British publisher of black and Asian literature, and a women's and community rights activist. She is notable as the founder in 1969 of Bogle-L'Ouverture Publications in London.

Early life
She was born in Bagotstown, British Guiana (now Guyana). She was the only daughter and youngest of four children of James Carroll and his wife, Hectorine Carroll (nee Esbrand). 

Jessica was three years old when her father died, and her mother struggled financially to raise her children, nevertheless instilling the values of independence, discipline, justice and loyalty that informed Jessica's life. Unable to finish high school on the family's meagre finances, Jessica attended evening classes in shorthand and typing. With the hope of a clerical position becoming available, she worked in a garment factory, where she took up the cause of exploited female workers.

In 1950, she married Eric Huntley, and in the following two years gave birth to their first two children.

Career
In January 1950, Jessica Huntley co-founded the first national government of British Guiana, elected through mass suffrage, alongside Leaders Cheddi Jagan, Janet Jagan, Eric Huntley, Eusi Kwayana and other members of the People's Progressive Party. In May 1953, Jessica Huntley co-founded in then British Guiana the Women's Progressive Organization to focus on women's rights as part of the People's Progressive Party's (PPP) independence struggle.

She was appointed as the organizing secretary of the PPP, and stood as a candidate in the general election, but was not elected. She moved to the UK in April 1958, following her husband, who had moved there in 1957 to look for work.

Bogle-L'Ouverture Publications
In 1969 Huntley co-founded, with her husband Eric Huntley, the London-based publishing company Bogle-L'Ouverture Publications (BLP), which was named in honour of two heroes of the Caribbean resistance, Toussaint L'Ouverture and Paul Bogle. Beginning with The Groundings With My Brothers, by Guyanese historian and scholar Walter Rodney, BLP went on to publish books by an expanding range of authors, including Andrew Salkey, Linton Kwesi Johnson, Lemn Sissay and Valerie Bloom.

A blue plaque unveiled in October 2018 outside the Huntleys' West Ealing home commemorates their work in the founding of Bogle-L'Ouverture.

Other activity

The Bogle-L'Ouverture bookshop, opened by the Huntleys in Ealing in 1975, was one of the first Black bookshops in the UK, renamed as the Walter Rodney Bookshop following Rodney's assassination in 1980, and was a central hub for community action and creativity.

Huntley was instrumental in the establishment of the International Book Fair of Radical Black and Third World Books, held between 1982 and 1995, of which she was joint director with John La Rose until 1984.

Among other activism, in the 1980s Huntley was a co-founder with Margaret Busby and others of Greater Access to Publishing (GAP), a voluntary group campaigning for greater diversity within the mainstream publishing industry.

Personal life
In 1948, she first met Eric Huntley (born 1929), who was at the time a postal worker and trade union activist. They married on 9 December 1950 and lived for a period in the village of Buxton. They co-founded a political study group that met in their rented house. They had two sons there: Karl (who was named after Karl Marx) in 1951, and Chauncey in 1952.

Jessica Huntley died On 13 October 2013 at Ealing Hospital. She is survived by her husband, Eric, and their children Chauncey and Accabre. Their son Karl died two years earlier, also on 13 October. Hundreds of people went to her funeral at Southall's Christ the Redeemer Church. She was buried in Greenford Park Cemetery.

Archives and legacy

In 2005, papers relating to the business of Bogle-L'Ouverture, together with documents concerning the personal, campaigning and educational initiatives of Jessica and Eric Huntley from 1952 to 2011, were deposited at London Metropolitan Archives (LMA).

Since 2006, the Huntley Archives at LMA have inspired an annual conference on themes reflecting different elements of the content of the collection.

A blue plaque, organized by the Nubian Jak Community Trust and others, was unveiled in October 2018 outside the Ealing home of Jessica Huntley and Eric Huntley to commemorate their work in founding Bogle-L'Ouverture.

See also
 John La Rose
 Margaret Busby

References

Further reading
 Margaret Andrews, Doing Nothing is Not An Option: The Radical Lives of Eric & Jessica Huntley, Middlesex, England: Krik Krak, 2014. .

External links
 FHALMA website
 Peter Fraser, "Jessica Huntley 1927–2013 An appreciation", Stabroek News, 21 October 2013.
 Kimani Nehusi, Margaret Busby and Luke Daniels, "Jessica Huntley: a great tree has fallen", Pambazuka News, 30 October 2013.
 "Unlocking the Huntley Archives", London's Sound Heritage, 12 April 2019.
 "Jessica Huntley RIP 2013". YouTube video.
 Kenness Kelly, "JESSICA HUNTLEY HER LEGACY TRANS 01 Title 01", 24 March 2016.

1927 births
2013 deaths
British publishers (people)
Guyanese emigrants to the United Kingdom
Guyanese activists
Guyanese women activists
Black British activists
Guyanese women in politics